Mayday is a 1978 board wargame published by Game Designers' Workshop. Mayday was part of a series produced by GDW called "Series 120" – games with 120 pieces that were designed to be learned and played in 120 minutes. It was the second boardgame to be published for Traveller. A second edition was published in 1980. It was republished in 2004 as part of Far Future Enterprises Traveller: The Classic Games, Games 1-6+.

Gameplay
Mayday is about battles between small spaceships, and is designed to go with Traveller.

Reception
Tony Zamparutti reviewed Mayday in The Space Gamer No. 18. Zamparutti commented that "By itself, Mayday is not that exciting of a game. Although its movement system is innovative, the game as a whole is not as good as many other tactical space games".

David Ritchie reviewed Mayday in Ares #1, rating it a 6 out of 9. Ritchie commented that "Combat, maneuver and navigation are all affected by the capacity of the ship's computer and the program currently in progress (a nice touch). Relatively simple. Playable within two hours."

Mayday won the 1978 Origins Award for Best Fantasy or Science Fiction Wargame.

Reviews
Phoenix #22 (November/December 1979)

See also
Traveller boardgames

References

External links

Board games introduced in 1978
Game Designers' Workshop games
GDW Series 120 games
Origins Award winners
Traveller (role-playing game) board games
Wargames introduced in 1978